Forest City is a city in Holt County, Missouri, United States. The population was 243 at the 2020 census.

History
Forest City was platted in 1857.  The city was named from the dense forest near the original the town site. A post office called Forest City has been in operation since 1857.

City Hall was listed on the National Register of Historic Places in 1980.

Geography
Forest City is located at  (39.983135, -95.190735).

Demographics

2010 census
As of the census of 2010, there were 268 people, 117 households, and 70 families residing in the city. The racial makeup of the city was 95.5% White, 1.1% Native American, 2.2% from other races, and 1.1% from two or more races. Hispanic or Latino of any race were 2.2% of the population.

There were 117 households, of which 26.5% had children under the age of 18 living with them, 51.3% were married couples living together, 4.3% had a female householder with no husband present, 4.3% had a male householder with no wife present, and 40.2% were non-families. 34.2% of all households were made up of individuals, and 16.3% had someone living alone who was 65 years of age or older. The average household size was 2.29 and the average family size was 2.94.

The median age in the city was 43.8 years. 22.4% of residents were under the age of 18; 7.4% were between the ages of 18 and 24; 21.6% were from 25 to 44; 31.7% were from 45 to 64; and 16.8% were 65 years of age or older. The gender makeup of the city was 53.4% male and 46.6% female.

2000 census
As of the census of 2000, there were 338 people, 139 households, and 91 families residing in the city. The population density was 346.3 people per square mile (133.2/km2). There were 148 housing units at an average density of 151.6 per square mile (58.3/km2). The racial makeup of the city was 96.15% White, 0.89% African American, 0.59% Native American, and 2.37% from two or more races.

There were 139 households, out of which 29.5% had children under the age of 18 living with them, 54.0% were married couples living together, 6.5% had a female householder with no husband present, and 34.5% were non-families. 28.8% of all households were made up of individuals, and 16.5% had someone living alone who was 65 years of age or older. The average household size was 2.43 and the average family size was 3.05.

In the city the population was spread out, with 25.4% under the age of 18, 6.2% from 18 to 24, 30.5% from 25 to 44, 22.5% from 45 to 64, and 15.4% who were 65 years of age or older. The median age was 38 years. For every 100 females, there were 98.8 males. For every 100 females age 18 and over, there were 89.5 males.

The median income for a household in the city was $31,016, and the median income for a family was $32,500. Males had a median income of $25,893 versus $16,500 for females. The per capita income for the city was $18,671. About 1.0% of families and 4.4% of the population were below the poverty line, including 2.4% of those under age 18 and 13.6% of those age 65 or over.

References

External links
 Historic maps of Forest City in the Sanborn Maps of Missouri Collection at the University of Missouri

Cities in Holt County, Missouri
Cities in Missouri
1857 establishments in Missouri
Populated places established in 1857